Handan Airport , also known as Handan Matou Airport or Handan Nanjiao Airport, is an airport serving the city of Handan in Hebei Province, China. It is located 11 kilometers southwest of Handan, and 43 kilometers north of the city of Anyang in neighboring Henan Province.  The airport was opened in August 2007 and is now undergoing a 120 million yuan expansion.

Facilities
The airport has one runway that is 2,200 meters long and 45 meters wide, and a 15,000 square-meter terminal building. In June 2011, construction started to expand the airport which includes lengthening the runway to 2,600 meters.

Airlines and destinations

Handan Airport is served by the following airlines:

See also
List of airports in China
List of the busiest airports in China

References

Airports in Hebei
Airports established in 2007
2007 establishments in China
Handan